Dragon's Green is a hamlet in the civil parish of Shipley, and the Horsham district of West Sussex, England.

The parish village of Shipley is just under  to the south. The hamlet is centered on the George and Dragon public house.

External links

Hamlets in West Sussex
Horsham District